Petraea may refer to :
 Arabia Petraea, a frontier province of the Roman Empire

See also
 Petraeus (disambiguation)